Hannjo Hasse (31 August 1921 – 5 February 1983) was an East German actor.

Biography
Hasse began studying acting in 1938, and attended Lily Ackermann's Institute for Stage Artists' Education in Berlin. At 1941, he was drafted for the Labour Service, and later to the Army. After the end of the Second World War and his release from captivity, Hasse returned to Weimar, where he spent another six months to complete his drama training.

He made his debut on stage in the Nordhausen Theater, where he was also employed as a dramaturgue. Later, he also worked in theaters in Eisleben, Burg bei Magdeburg and Schwerin, before settling in the Hans Otto Theater in Potsdam, in which he was a member of the regular cast between 1954 and 1962. Afterwards, he moved to Berlin's Volksbühne, and then to the Deutsches Theater. Hasse played a wide range of supporting characters, from Malvolio to the Fledermaus.

Hasse made his first appearance on screen already during 1951, playing a minor role in Der Untertan. From the late 1950s, he focused mainly on cinema and television work. Although his earlier stage roles were mostly comical in nature, he depicted sinister characters almost solely: Renate Seydel, who interviewed him in 1966, commented that he was the most perennial villain in the actors' cast of DEFA and Deutscher Fernsehfunk. He portrayed greedy pioneers who seek to dispossess Native Americans in many of East Germany's Red Western pictures. He is also remembered for depicting SD Colonel von Dietrich in the Yugoslav partisan film Walter Defends Sarajevo or gestapo officer in the Czechoslovak film Higher Principle. In addition to those entertainment films, he also portrayed historical antagonists in several bleaker pictures dealing with recent past, like Alfred Naujocks in The Gleiwitz Case, Reinhard Heydrich
in Sokolovo and Adolf Eichmann in the 1966 Lebende Ware – based on the blood for goods affair. Hasse told Seydel that he considered those roles as having educational value, in order to "demonstrate the full horror of Fascism" to younger viewers.

Hasse was awarded the Art Prize of the German Democratic Republic on 7 May 1971.

Selected filmography

1951: Der Untertan – Mann (uncredited)
1954: Gefährliche Fracht – Sekretär von Harms
1954: Stärker als die Nacht
1954: Ernst Thälmann - Sohn seiner Klasse
1955: Ham wa nich!
1956: Die Millionen der Yvette – Herr
1956: Der Hauptmann von Köln
1957: Wo Du hin gehst – Adjutant
1958: Cerný prapor – Wolf
1959: Kapitäne bleiben an Bord – 2. Steuermann
1959: Sterne – Captain
1959: Bevor der Blitz einschlägt
1959: Weißes Blut – Dr. Kopf
1959: Kabale und Liebe
1960: Einer von uns – Catteau
1960: Seilergasse 8
1960: Leute mit Flügeln – SS-Offizier
1960: Vyšší princip – vrchní komisar Worlitzek
1961: Der Fall Gleiwitz – Alfred Naujocks
1961: Gewissen in Aufruhr (TV Mini-Series) – Oberst Rolf Steiner
1961: The Dress – Harry Riebauer (voice, uncredited)
1962: Freispruch mangels Beweises – Prosecutor Fuhrmann
1962: Polnocná omsa – Brecker
1962: An französischen Kaminen – Major Siebert
1963: Nebel – Mr. Edwards
1963: Reserviert für den Tod – Hauptmann Donath
1964: Preludio 11 – Barro (voice)
1964: Das Lied vom Trompeter – Pietzker
1966: Die Söhne der großen Bärin – Pitt
1966: Pharaoh – (german version, voice)
1966: Schwarze Panther – Leon
1966: Das Tal der sieben Monde – Sanitter
1967: Smrt za oponou – nemecký policista Hans Kreibe
1967: Die gefrorenen Blitze – SD Officer Zech
1967: Das Mädchen auf dem Brett – Klemm
1968: Spur des Falken – Bludgeon
1968: Mohr und die Raben von London – Mr. Cross
1968: Der Mord, der nie verjährt – Kapitänleutnant Pflugk-Hartung
1969: Lebende Ware – Adolf Eichmann
1969: Nebelnacht – Dr. Egbert Nikolai
1969: The Bridge – SS-Standartenführer Hoffmann
1970: Liberation I: The Fire Bulge – General Fieldmarshal Günther von Kluge
1970: Liberation II: Breakthrough – General Fieldmarshal Günther von Kluge
1970: Tödlicher Irrtum – Lee Garrett
1971: KLK Calling PTZ - The Red Orchestra – Ein Deutscher
1971: Liberation III: Direction of the Main Blow – General Fieldmarshal Günther von Kluge
1972: Valter brani Sarajevo – SS-Standartenführer Von Dietrich
1972: Ukradená bitva – von Seydlitz
1972: Nakovalnya ili chuk – Nebe
1973: Copernicus – Andreas Osiander – editor
1973: Die Hosen des Ritters von Bredow – Geheimer Rat von Lindenberg
1973: Unterm Birnbaum – Justizrat Vowinkel
1974: Das Geheimnis des Ödipus (TV Movie) – Oberfeldwebel
1974: Ulzana – Der Herr aus Washington
1974: Wie füttert man einen Esel – Vertreter Hasse
1974: Zum Beispiel Josef – Ausbilder in der Legion
1974: Johannes Kepler – Oberkontrolleur
1974:  – Captain Consadine
1975: Front bez flangov – General von Horn
1975: Sokolovo – Reinhard Heydrich
1975: Atentat u Sarajevu
1975–1979: Das unsichtbare Visier (TV Series) – Van Straaten / Cliff
1976: Hostess – Fiatbesitzer
1976: Beethoven – Tage aus einem Leben – Fürst Karl Lichnowski
1977: Der kleine Zauberer und die große Fünf – Der Drachen (voice)
1977: Auftrag – Überleben (TV Movie) – Willi
1977: Wer reißt denn gleich vor’m Teufel aus – Hofmarschall
1978:  – General von Horn
1978: Fleur Lafontaine – Arzt
1979: Einfach Blumen aufs Dach – DHZ-Direktor
1980: Archiv des Todes (TV Series) – Major Zirrgiebel
1980: Die Schmuggler von Rajgrod – von Thunsdorff
1980: Der Baulöwe – Herr Paul
1980: Yunost Petra
1980: Levins Mühle – Rittmeister von Lojewski
1980: Svítalo celou noc – Mjr. Krombach
1981: Peters Jugend
1982: Front v tylu vraga – General von Horn
1983: 'Martin Luther''

References

External links

1921 births
1983 deaths
Actors from Bonn
People from the Rhine Province
German Army personnel of World War II
German male stage actors
German male film actors
German male television actors
Recipients of the Art Prize of the German Democratic Republic
20th-century German male actors
Reich Labour Service members
German prisoners of war in World War II